Acanthodoris is a genus of sea slugs, dorid nudibranchs, shell-less marine gastropod mollusks in the family Onchidorididae. The genus is believed to have originated in the Atlantic Ocean in the Cretaceous period and spread to the Pacific Ocean. The relationships of Acanthodoris to the other genera in the family Onchidorididae were evaluated by molecular phylogeny in 2015.

Species 
Species within this genus include:
Acanthodoris armata O'Donoghue, 1927 (taxon inquirendum)
Acanthodoris atrogriseata O'Donoghue, 1927
Acanthodoris brunnea MacFarland, 1905
Acanthodoris caerulescens Bergh, 1880 (taxon inquirendum)
Acanthodoris falklandica Eliot, 1907
Acanthodoris globosa Abraham, 1877
Acanthodoris hudsoni MacFarland, 1905
Acanthodoris lutea MacFarland, 1925
Acanthodoris metulifera Bergh, 1905
Acanthodoris mollicella Abraham, 1877
Acanthodoris nanaimoensis O'Donoghue, 1921
Acanthodoris nanega Burn, 1969
Acanthodoris pilosa (Abildgaard in Müller, 1789) - type species, synonyms: Doris quadrangulata Jeffreys, 1869
Acanthodoris pina Ev. Marcus & Er. Marcus, 1967 
Acanthodoris planca Fahey & Valdés, 2005
Acanthodoris rhodoceras Cockerell in Cockerell & Eliot, 1905
Acanthodoris uchidai Baba, 1935
Acanthodoris vatheleti Rochebrune & Mabille, 1891 (nomen dubium)
Species brought into synonymy
 Acanthodoris bifida (Verrill, 1870): synonym of Acanthodoris pilosa (Abildgaard in Müller, 1789)
 Acanthodoris citrina (Verrill, 1879): synonym of Acanthodoris pilosa (Abildgaard in Müller, 1789)
 Acanthodoris columbina MacFarland, 1926: synonym of Acanthodoris nanaimoensis O'Donoghue, 1921
 Acanthodoris ornata (Verrill, 1879): synonym of Acanthodoris pilosa (Abildgaard in Müller, 1789)
 Acanthodoris pallida Bergh, 1905: synonym of Acanthodoris pilosa (Abildgaard in Müller, 1789)
 Acanthodoris pilosa ornata (Verrill, 1879): synonym of Acanthodoris pilosa (Abildgaard in Müller, 1789)
 Acanthodoris serpentinotus Williams & Gosliner, 1979: synonym of Acanthodoris pina Ev. Marcus & Er. Marcus, 1967
 Acanthodoris stellata (Gmelin, 1791): synonym of Acanthodoris pilosa (Abildgaard in Müller, 1789)
 Acanthodoris stohleri Lance, 1968: synonym of Acanthodoris pina Ev. Marcus & Er. Marcus, 1967
 Acanthodoris subquadrata (Alder & Hancock, 1845): synonym of Acanthodoris pilosa (Abildgaard in Müller, 1789)

References

 Vaught, K.C. (1989). A classification of the living Mollusca. American Malacologists: Melbourne, FL (USA). . XII, 195 pp.
 Gofas, S.; Le Renard, J.; Bouchet, P. (2001). Mollusca, in: Costello, M.J. et al. (Ed.) (2001). European register of marine species: a check-list of the marine species in Europe and a bibliography of guides to their identification. Collection Patrimoines Naturels, 50: pp. 180–213

Onchidorididae
Taxa named by John Edward Gray